Oscytel (or Oskytel or Oscetel; died 971) was a medieval Bishop of Dorchester and Archbishop of York.

Early life
Oscytel was probably of Danish ancestry. He was related to Oswald, Bishop of Worcester and later Archbishop of York, and Thurcytel, who was abbot of Bedford Abbey. All three men were landowners in the eastern midlands, with Oskytel owning lands at Beeby, in Leicestershire. No other information about Oskytel's birth and upbringing is known. A legend stated that his father was a Dane who arrived in England as part of a pagan war band.

Bishop
Oscytel was selected to the see of Dorchester sometime between 934 and 951, probably close to 951 for the Anglo-Saxon Chronicle says that he had been a bishop for twenty-two years when he died. 951 is also when he first attests a charter as bishop. A previous mention of an "Oscetel" as either a sacrist or treasurer in 949 may or may not be the same person. Oskytel only starts showing up consistently after the death of King Eadred of England, who left the bishop some bequests in his will. At first Oskytel supported King Eadwig of England, but in about 958 he switched to supporting Eadwig's brother King Edgar of England.

Archbishop
Oscytel became archbishop in 958. However, he continued to hold the see of Dorchester along with York, a practice known as pluralism. It is probably due to Oskytel's pluralism that Nottinghamshire was added to the see of York instead of remaining with Dorchester where it had been before. The Anglo Saxon Chronicle from Ramsey says that he went to Rome for his pallium, but no other sources say that he did so. While archbishop he advanced the career of his kinsman Oswald by bringing him to the attention of Dunstan, and encouraging Oswald's foundation of Ramsey Abbey. Oskytel also was a benefactor to the new monastic houses that were formed in the fens during his time as archbishop. The precise nature of Oskytel's and Oswald's relationship is unclear, but they were relatives.

Death
Oscytel died on 1 November 971 or on 31 October 971 at Thame, and was buried at Bedford. The ancient minster of St Paul's Church, Bedford is accepted as the site of his grave.

Citations

References

External links
 

971 deaths
Archbishops of York
Bishops of Dorchester (Mercia)
10th-century English archbishops
Year of birth unknown